Hamilton Bobby (died 10 December 2011) was an Indian international footballer.

Career
Bobby played for Tamil Nadu between 1992, and 2000, captaining them twice in the Santosh Trophy.He was selected as the best player of the 1992 Santosh Trophy despite missing a penalty kick in Tamil Nadu's loss to Goa in the shootout in the semifinal.

He also represented India at under-16, under-23 and full international level, playing at the President's Cup.

Personal life
He was the younger brother of fellow player Xavier Pius.

He died on 10 December 2011 from a heart attack, aged 44.

References

1960s births
2011 deaths
Indian footballers
India international footballers
Sportspeople from Kochi
Footballers from Kerala
Association football midfielders